Siah Estalakh (also Romanized as Sīāh Esţalakh, Sīāh Esţalkh, and Sīyāh Estalkh; also known as Siāh Sal, Siasal’, and Siyah Estelakh Hoomeh) is a village in Pir Bazar Rural District, in the Central District of Rasht County, Gilan Province, Iran. At the 2006 census, its population was 4,415, in 1,194 families.

References 

Populated places in Rasht County